Gedney railway station was a station in Gedney, Lincolnshire. It was a station on the Midland and Great Northern Joint Railway network. It opened on 1 July 1862, and closed on 2 March 1959.
The station building survives today and has recently been fully renovated as a residential dwelling. The original line gates have been preserved.

References

External links
http://www.geograph.org.uk/photo/28557

Disused railway stations in Lincolnshire
Former Midland and Great Northern Joint Railway stations
Railway stations in Great Britain opened in 1862
Railway stations in Great Britain closed in 1959
1862 establishments in England
1959 disestablishments in England